The carabao is a domestic swamp-type water buffalo (Bubalus bubalis) native to the Philippines. Carabaos were introduced to Guam from the Spanish Philippines in the 17th century. They have acquired great cultural significance to the Chamorro people and are considered the unofficial national animal of Guam. In Malaysia, carabaos (known as kerbau in Malay) are the official animal of the state of Negeri Sembilan.

Etymology
The Spanish word  is derived from Visayan (likely Waray) . Cognates include Cebuano , Javanese , Malay , and Indonesian Dutch . The word's resemblance to caribou is coincidental, and they do not share a common etymology — an example of a false cognate.

Before the Spanish era, carabaos were more widely known as nuang among the Ilocanos of Northern Luzon, and anowang and damulag among the ethnic groups of southern and central Luzon.

Characteristics 

Carabaos have the low, wide, and heavy build of draught animals. They vary in colour from light grey to slate grey. The horns are sickle-shaped or curve backward toward the neck. Chevrons are common. Albinoids are present in the proportion of about 3% of the buffalo population. Mature male carabaos weigh , and females .

Water buffaloes imported to the Philippines from Cambodia in the early 20th century are called "Cambodian carabaos". They have white or yellowish hair on a pinkish skin, but the eyes, hooves, and mouth are dark, and the skin may be speckled. They are slightly bigger and have larger horns. Males weigh on average  and measure  at the withers.

Carabao 

Water buffalo are well adapted to a hot and humid climate. Water availability is of high importance in hot climates since they need wallows, rivers, or splashing water to reduce the heat load and thermal stress. Swamp buffaloes prefer to wallow in a mudhole that they make with the horns. Their objective is to acquire a thick coating of mud. They thrive on many aquatic plants and in time of flood will graze submerged, raising their heads above the water and carrying quantities of edible plants. They eat reeds, the giant reed, bulrush, sedges, the common water hyacinth, and rushes. Green fodders are used widely for intensive milk production and for fattening. Many fodder crops are conserved as hay, chaffed, or pulped. Trials in the Philippines showed that the carabao, on poor-quality roughage, had a better feed conversion rate than cattle.

The carabao cools itself by lying in a waterhole or mud during the heat of the day. Mud, caked on to its body, also protects it from bothersome insects. The carabao feeds mainly in the cool of the mornings and evenings. Its lifespan is 18 to 20 years. The female carabao can deliver one calf each year.

The Philippines 

The oldest evidence of water buffalo discovered in the Philippines is multiple fragmentary skeletal remains recovered from the upper layers of the Neolithic Nagsabaran site, part of the Lal-lo and Gattaran Shell Middens (~2200 BCE to 400 CE) of northern Luzon. Most of the remains consisted of skull fragments, almost all of which have cut marks indicating they were butchered. The remains are associated with red slipped pottery, spindle whorls, stone adzes, and jade bracelets; which have strong affinities to similar artifacts from Neolithic Austronesian archeological sites in Taiwan. Based on the radiocarbon date of the layer in which the oldest fragments were found, water buffalo were first introduced to the Philippines by at least 500 BCE.

In the early 20th century, other breeds of water buffalo were imported from China (the "Shanghai buffalo") and Cambodia for work in sugarcane plantations. These were generally larger and have bigger horns. Murrah buffaloes were first introduced from India in 1917. A few representatives of the Nili-Ravi breed have also been acquired. The word carabao is now used for the imported river-type buffalo as well as for the local swamp buffalo.

Carabaos are widely distributed in all the larger islands of the Philippines. Carabao hide was once used extensively to create a variety of products, including the armor of precolonial Philippine warriors.

In the late 1980s, the carabao puppet character Kardong Kalabaw became popular as a symbol of the Philippine people's hard work and sense of industry.

In 1993, the Philippine Carabao Center was established to conserve, propagate, and promote the carabao as a source of draught animal power, meat, milk, and hide to benefit the rural farmers through carabao genetic improvement, technology development and dissemination, and establishment of carabao-based enterprises, thus ensuring higher income and better nutrition. The National Water Buffalo Gene Pool in Muñoz, Nueva Ecija, is a facility for continuous selection, testing, and propagation of superior breeds of dairy buffalo.

In 2003, 3.2 million carabao were in the Philippines; 99% belonged to small farmers who have limited resources, low income, and little access to other economic opportunities.

One of the many reasons for the failure of the attempted Japanese pacification of the Philippines during their 1941–1945 occupation was their indifference to the basics of the Philippine economy. The carabaos provided the necessary labor that allowed Philippine farmers to grow rice and other staples. Japanese army patrols would not only confiscate the rice, but would also slaughter the carabaos for meat, thereby preventing the farmers from growing enough rice to feed the large population. Before World War II, an estimated three million carabaos inhabited the Philippines. By the end of the war, an estimated nearly 70% of them had been lost.

The old  method of farming is still the method of choice in Northern Samar. The soil of the rice paddy is first softened with rainwater or diverted watershed, then the farmer guides a group of carabaos in trampling the planting area until it is soggy enough to receive the rice seedlings. This time-consuming task produces lower yields and lower income when compared with the advancement in irrigated fields.

Despite the popular notion that the carabao has been declared the national animal of the Philippines, the National Commission for Culture and the Arts of the Philippines has stated that this has no basis in Philippine law.

Carabao racing 

Carabao racing is a widely popular sport among farmers and carabao enthusiasts in the Philippines. In central, southern Luzon and South Cotabato some fiestas are highlighted with carabaos racing up towards the finish line. Training and conditioning of the race carabao to its full extent is a serious job. Farmers and their trustworthy carabaos gather together to race in a  dirt road. Spectators fill up this unique spectacle, some betting on their best carabaos, others watch for the thrill. The carabaos, geared with their carts on their back, race together with their farmer to win prizes. The race is divided into two classes, one for amateur or first-time carabao racers and the other is for the veteran carabao racers. A race carabao can be bought for ₱35,000 to ₱60,000, with the price increasing with the number of races that it wins. Proven race winners can command a price as high as ₱200,000.

In Guam 
Carabaos were introduced to Guam by Spanish missionaries in the 17th century from domestic stock in the Philippines to be used as beasts of burden. A feral herd on the US Naval Magazine in central Guam was classified as protected game, but the population has been declining since 1982, most likely due to illegal hunting.

Carabaos were used for farming and for pulling carts. They were fairly common on Guam before the 20th century, with a population numbering in the thousands. Today, they are rare in most parts of the island except in the US Naval Magazine near the village of Santa Rita, which is fenced on all sides. The carabao population of Naval Magazine has grown to several hundred, to the point that they have become a pest and caused environmental damage, and polluted the water supply in the Fena Reservoir. In 2003, the Navy began a program of extermination to control the carabao population of Naval Magazine, a move that was protested by many Chamorro people.

The carabao is considered a symbol of Guam.  In the early 1960s, carabao races were a popular sport in the island, especially during fiestas. Today, carabaos are a part of the popular culture. They are often brought to carnivals or other festivities, and are used as a popular ride for children. Carabao meat is sometimes eaten as a delicacy.

In Malaysia 
The carabao is the official animal of the state of Negeri Sembilan, Malaysia.

See also 

Tamaraw
Philippine Carabao Center
Military Order of the Carabao

References

Bovines
Mammals of the Philippines
Water buffalo breeds
National symbols of the Philippines